Pieter Johannes Elisabeth Kerkhoffs (26 March 1936 – 19 October 2021), known as Pierre Kerkhoffs, was a Dutch footballer who played at both professional and international levels as a striker. Kerkhoffs played club football for SC Enschede and PSV, and was the Eredivisie top scorer in the 1962–63 season. He later played in Switzerland for Lausanne Sport.

Kekhoffs also earned five caps for the Netherlands between 1960 and 1965.

Honours
PSV Eindhoven
 Eredivisie: 1962–63

Individual
 Eredivisie top scorer: 1962–63

References

External links
 Voetbal International 
 Voetbal Stats 

1936 births
2021 deaths
People from Geleen
Association football forwards
Dutch footballers
Netherlands international footballers
Eredivisie players
Sportclub Enschede players
PSV Eindhoven players
FC Lausanne-Sport players
Neuchâtel Xamax FCS players
Dutch expatriate sportspeople in Switzerland
Expatriate footballers in Switzerland
Dutch expatriate footballers
Footballers from Limburg (Netherlands)